Kim Kyungah (born May 25, 1977 in Daejeon, South Korea) is a South Korean table tennis player. She was the bronze medalist in women's singles at 2004 Athens Olympics. She was 6th in the ITTF world ranking as of March 2013.

In May 2011, Kim Kyungah qualified for the 2012 Summer Olympics.  She was eliminated in the quarter-finals as a single player.  Her team made it to the bronze medal match, but was defeated by the Singaporean team.

Career records

Olympic Games

World Championship

Asian Games

World Cup

World Tour

World Team Cup

Asian Championship

Asian Cup

References

1977 births
Living people
South Korean female table tennis players
Olympic table tennis players of South Korea
Table tennis players at the 2004 Summer Olympics
Table tennis players at the 2008 Summer Olympics
Olympic bronze medalists for South Korea
Olympic medalists in table tennis
Asian Games medalists in table tennis
Table tennis players at the 2012 Summer Olympics
Medalists at the 2008 Summer Olympics
Table tennis players at the 2010 Asian Games
Table tennis players at the 2006 Asian Games
Medalists at the 2004 Summer Olympics
Asian Games bronze medalists for South Korea
Medalists at the 2006 Asian Games
Medalists at the 2010 Asian Games
World Table Tennis Championships medalists
South Korean expatriate sportspeople in China
Sportspeople from Daejeon
21st-century South Korean women